Atrypanius heyrovskyi is a species of beetle in the family Cerambycidae. It was described by Gilmour in 1960 and named in honour of Leopold Heyrovský

References

Acanthocinini
Beetles described in 1960